Michael Elliott Reed (born April 27, 1995) is an American professional baseball outfielder in the Los Angeles Dodgers organization.

Early life and education
Reed attended St. George's School in Middletown, Rhode Island. He played baseball, hockey and soccer.

Amateur career
Reed was drafted by the Texas Rangers in the 13th round of the 2013 Major League Baseball Draft. He did not sign and attended the University of Florida where he played college baseball for the Florida Gators.

As a freshman at Florida in 2014, Reed started 51 of 60 games, hitting .244 over 172 at-bats. After a 1–14 start his sophomore year in 2015, he started wearing glasses on the field. That year he started 69 of 70 games and hit .305/.367/.433 with four home runs, 47 runs batted in (RBI) and 18 stolen bases. After the season, he played for the United States collegiate national team during the summer. In 2015, he batted .305 with four home runs and 47 RBIs. As a junior in 2016, he batted .262 with four home runs, 32 RBIs and 24 stolen bases.

Professional career

San Diego Padres
After his junior year, Reed was drafted by the San Diego Padres in the second round of the 2016 MLB draft. He signed and was assigned to the Tri-City Dust Devils, where he spent all of his first professional season, batting .254 with 13 RBIs and 15 stolen bases in 51 games. In 2017, he played for the Fort Wayne TinCaps where he posted a .234 batting average with six home runs and 35 RBIs in 88 games.

In 2018, he played with both the Lake Elsinore Storm and the San Antonio Missions, slashing .271/.319/.435 with 13 home runs, 62 RBIs, and 51 stolen bases in 122 games between both teams. He spent 2019 with the Amarillo Sod Poodles, hitting .228 with 14 home runs, fifty RBIs, and 23 stolen bases over 121 games.

Oakland Athletics
On December 12, 2019, Reed was traded to the Oakland Athletics as the player to be named later in the Jurickson Profar trade. Reed did not play in a game in 2020 due to the cancellation of the minor league season because of the COVID-19 pandemic. In 2021, Reed spent the majority of the year with the Triple-A Las Vegas Aviators, hitting .255/.367/.363 with one home run and 14 RBI.

In 2022, he played in 20 games for Las Vegas, slashing .196/.255/.196 with no home runs and 3 RBI. He was released by the Athletics on May 10, 2022.

Los Angeles Dodgers
On June 18, 2022, Reed signed a minor league contract with the Los Angeles Dodgers organization. He then appeared in 28 games for the Double-A Tulsa Drillers. He hit .247 between the two teams.

References

External links

Florida Gators bio

1995 births
Living people
Baseball players from Maryland
Baseball outfielders
Florida Gators baseball players
Kenosha Kingfish players
Tri-City Dust Devils players
Fort Wayne TinCaps players
Canberra Cavalry players
Lake Elsinore Storm players
San Antonio Missions players
Peoria Javelinas players
Amarillo Sod Poodles players
Las Vegas Aviators players
Arizona Complex League Athletics players
Arizona Complex League Dodgers players
St. George's School (Rhode Island) alumni
Minor league baseball players
Tulsa Drillers players